Concordia Theatre is a theatre located on Stockwell Head in Hinckley, England, located in the centre of the town.  The theatre opened their doors publicly on 28 November 1972, with the first production at the venue being a sold-out production of The Sound of Music.

About 
Hinckley's 400-seat theatre is run and maintained by a dedicated band of volunteers. The theatre is home to a number of local amateur societies which stage around 30 productions each year.

These include; the Amateur Operatic Society, Stanley Opera Company, Hinckley & District Scouts, Community Guild, Broughton Astley Drama Society (BADS), Concordia Youth Theatre (CYT), Tinhatters, New Theatre Players, Pantomime Company and Choral Union.

The theatre was created by the transformation of a disused hosiery factory in order to solve the then Hinckley Baptist Operatic Society's lack of suitable accommodation for their productions in the late 1960s.

External links
Concordia Theatre Hinckley
Concordia Youth Theatre Hinckley
Stanley Opera Society Hinckley
The Pantomime Company

References

Theatres in Leicestershire
Hinckley